Wild Blue may refer to
WildBlue, a two-way satellite ISP subdivision of ViaSat
The Wild Blue: The Novel of the U.S. Air Force, 1986 book by Walter J. Boyne and Steven L. Thompson
The Wild Blue, 2001 book by Stephen Ambrose about B-24 bombers
Wild Blue (Part I), 2019 album by Hunter Hayes
"Wild Blue", 2021 song by John Mayer from the album Sob Rock
Wild Blue, a restaurant on the 107th floor of the North Tower of the World Trade Center